This is a list of elections in Canada in 2007. Included are provincial, municipal and federal elections, by-elections on any level, referendums and party leadership races at any level.

January–April
 8 February: Ferryland, Kilbride, Port au Port provincial by-elections in Newfoundland and Labrador. See also 2007 Newfoundland and Labrador provincial by-elections.
 8 February: Burlington, Markham and York South—Weston provincial by-elections in Ontario. See also 2007 Ontario provincial by-elections.
 12 February: Humber Valley, Newfoundland and Labrador by-election
 5 March
2007 Moncton East provincial by-election, New Brunswick
2007 Martensville provincial by-election, Saskatchewan
 13 March: Labrador West, Newfoundland and Labrador by-election
 26 March: 2007 Quebec general election
 27 April: 2007 Nova Scotia Liberal Party leadership election

May–September
 6 May
Municipal elections in Granby, Quebec
Municipal by-election in Rivière-du-Loup, Quebec
 7 May: 2007 Nova Scotia Green Party leadership election 
 22 May: 2007 Manitoba general election
 28 May: 2007 Prince Edward Island general election
12 June: Provincial by-elections in Calgary-Elbow and Drumheller-Stettler, Alberta
14 June: Ward 2 by-election in Milton, Ontario
17 September: Federal by-elections in Outremont, Roberval—Lac-Saint-Jean and Saint-Hyacinthe—Bagot
24 September: Charlevoix provincial by-election in Quebec

October–December
 1 October: 2007 Northwest Territories general election
 2 October: Cole Harbour-Eastern Passage provincial by-election in Nova Scotia
 9 October: 2007 Newfoundland and Labrador general election
 9 October: 2007 Saint John, New Brunswick ward plebiscite
 10 October: Ontario general election and electoral reform referendum, 2007
 13 October: 2007 New Brunswick New Democratic Party leadership election
 15 October: 2007 Belfast-Murray River provincial by-election in Prince Edward Island
 15 October: 2007 Alberta municipal elections
 21 October: 2007 Green Party of British Columbia leadership election
 22 October: Plebiscite in Kugluktuk, Nunavut on forming an alcohol education committee 
 4 November: Quebec English School board elections.
 6 November: Grand Falls-Windsor-Buchans provincial by-election in Newfoundland and Labrador (postponed from general)
 7 November
2007 Saskatchewan general election
Saskatchewan municipal elections for even-numbered rural municipalities
 2 December: 2007 Quebec City municipal by-election
 16 December: Outremont municipal by-election

See also
Municipal elections in Canada
Elections in Canada